Pandan-Malang Toll Road is a toll road in East Java, Indonesia. This  highway connects Malang city with Pandaan of Pasuruan Regency. The toll road will reduce traffic movement of arterial roads and national roads, which facilitates industrial transportation to Malang and Batu city. The toll road reduced the travel time of Pandaan-Pasuruan-Malang to less than an hour.

Sections
Pandaan-Malang toll road  is divided into five sections,
Section I: Pandaan-Purwodadi is 15.47 km
Section II: Purwodadi-Lawang 8.05 km
Section III: Lawang-Singosari 7.10 km 
Section IV: Singosari-Pakis 4.75 km 
Section V: Pakis-Malang 3.11 km

Exits

References

Toll roads in Indonesia
Transport in East Java
Pasuruan Regency
Malang